Man vs. Wild  is a video game inspired by the Man vs. Wild survival television series. In it, the player takes on the role of host Bear Grylls to survive the hardships of various environments. It was developed by American companies Floor 84 Studio and Scientifically Proven.

The game targeted all major seventh-generation platforms, but the handheld versions were ultimately cancelled.

Reception
Man vs. Wild received an overall score of 4.5/10 from Gameplay Today. GameZone gave the game a 6.5 out of 10, stating "Man vs. Wild is a fun, easy game based on a successful television series. Those looking for the next life-changing experience will probably find themselves disappointed. On the other hand, they might learn skills that may be helpful in the event that they’re actually stranded in the wild one day."

References

External links
 Crave Games

2011 video games
Action video games
Cancelled Nintendo DS games
Cancelled PlayStation Portable games
North America-exclusive video games
PlayStation 3 games
Video games based on television series
Video games developed in the United States
Video games set in Africa
Video games set in Canada
Video games set in Florida
Video games set in Panama
Video games set in South America
Wii games
Xbox 360 games